Los Mazatlecos (The Mazatlan people) is an enforcer gang of the Beltrán Leyva Cartel. It is reportedly led by Fausto Isidro Meza Flores.

Activities
Los Mazatlecos gang were formed in the coastal city of Mazatlán, Sinaloa, from where they take their name. Initially, the gang was at the service of the drug lord Alfredo Beltrán Leyva ("El Mochomo") until he was arrested by the Mexican authorities in 2008. After his arrest, Los Mazatlecos shifted their alliance to Alfredo's brother Héctor Beltrán Leyva, the current leader of the Beltrán Leyva Cartel. The group is one of the largest gangs working for the cartel's criminal umbrella.

They are in a turf war against the Sinaloa Cartel, and are also responsible for numerous deaths and kidnappings on the Sinaloa and Durango area.

References

Gangs in Mexico
Beltrán-Leyva Cartel
Mazatlán
Mexican drug war